This contains the full episode list of the Japanese anime series Jungle Book Shōnen Mowgli.

Series overview

Episode list

References

Jungle Book Shonen Mowgli
Works based on The Jungle Book